This list of University of Chicago alumni consists of notable people who graduated or attended the University of Chicago. The alumni of the university include graduates and attendees. Graduates are defined as those who hold bachelor's, master's, or Ph.D. degrees from the university, while attendees are those who studied at the university but did not complete the program or obtain a degree. Honorary degree holders and auditors of the university are excluded. Summer session attendees are also excluded from the list since summer terms are not part of the university's formal academic years.

Nobel laureates

 Luis Alvarez (A.B. 1932, S.M. 1934, Ph.D. 1936) – Physics, 1968
 Emily Green Balch (attended) – Peace, 1946
 Gary Becker (A.M. 1953, Ph.D. 1955) – Economics, 1992
 Saul Bellow (X. 1939) – Literature, 1976
 Herbert Brown (S.B. 1936, Ph.D. 1938) – Chemistry, 1979
 James M. Buchanan (Ph.D. 1948) – Economics, 1986
 Owen Chamberlain (Ph.D. 1949) – Physics, 1959
 John Maxwell Coetzee (Professor) – Literature, 2003
 James Cronin (S.M. 1953, Ph.D. 1955) – Physics, 1980
 Clinton Davisson (S.B. 1909) – Physics, 1937
 Eugene Fama (M.B.A. 1963, Ph.D. 1964) – Economics, 2013
 Jerome Friedman (A.B. 1950, S.M. 1953, Ph.D. 1956) – Physics, 1990
 Milton Friedman (A.M. 1933) – Economics, 1976
 Ernest Lawrence (X. 1923) – Physics, 1939
 Tsung-Dao Lee (Ph.D. 1950) – Physics, 1957
 Robert Lucas Jr. (A.B. 1959, Ph.D. 1964) – Economics, 1995
 Harry Markowitz (A.B. 1947, A.M. 1950, Ph.D. 1955) – Economics, 1990
 Robert Millikan (X. 1894) – Physics, 1923
 Robert Mulliken (Ph.D. 1921) – Chemistry, 1966
 Paul Romer (S.B. 1977, Ph.D. 1983) – Economics, 2018
 Irwin Rose (S.B. 1948, Ph.D. 1952) – Chemistry, 2004
 F. Sherwood Rowland (S.M. 1951, Ph.D. 1952) – Chemistry, 1995
 Paul Samuelson (A.B. 1935) – Economics, 1970
 Myron Scholes (M.B.A. 1964, Ph.D. 1969) – Economics, 1997
 Herbert A. Simon (A.B. 1936, Ph.D. 1943) – Economics, 1978
 George E. Smith (Ph.D. 1959) – Physics, 2009
 Roger Sperry (Ph.D. 1941) – Medicine, 1981
 Jack Steinberger (S.B. 1942; Ph.D. 1949) – Physics, 1988
 George Stigler (S.B. 1942, Ph.D. 1949) – Economics, 1982
 Edward Lawrie Tatum (X. 1931) – Medicine, 1958
 Daniel Tsui (S.M. 1963; Ph.D. 1967) – Physics, 1998
 James Dewey Watson (S.B. 1947) – Medicine, 1962
 Frank Wilczek (A.B. 1970) – Physics, 2004; MacArthur Fellow (1982)
 Chen Ning Yang (Ph.D. 1948) – Physics, 1957

Government

Heads of state or government

Other government officials
 Shimon Agranat (J.D. 1929) – President of the Supreme Court of Israel (1965–1976)
 Saul Alinsky (Ph.B. 1930) – labor organizer and political activist
 Prince Chad Al-Sherif Pasha (M.A.P.S.S. 2006) – of the Hijaz and Turkey
 Bernard W. Aronson (A.B. 1967) – United States Assistant Secretary of State for Western Hemisphere Affairs (1989–1993)
 John Ashcroft (J.D. 1967) – Attorney General of the United States (2001–2005)
 David Axelrod (A.B. 1977) – author and former Senior Advisor to President Barack Obama
 Germà Bel (M.A. 1988) - Member of the Spanish Congress (2000-2004); member of the Catalan Parliament (2015-2017)
 Kwamena Bentsi-Enchill (1919–1974) – judge and academic; justice of the Supreme Court of Ghana (1971–1972)
 Paul Bloom (1939–2009) – lawyer who recovered $6 billion for the United States Department of Energy
 Robert H. Bork (A.B. 1948, J.D. 1953) – Attorney General of the United States (1973–1974); United States Court of Appeals Judge (1982–1988)
 Marvin Braude (1920–2005) – member of Los Angeles City Council (1965–1997)
 Lisa Brown (J.D. 1986) – White House Staff Secretary (2009–2011)
 William Holmes Brown (J.D. 1954) – Parliamentarian of the United States House of Representatives (1974–1994)
 Charles W. Bryan – 20th and 23rd Governor of Nebraska
 John E. Cashman – Member of the Wisconsin Senate from the 1st district
 Ahmed Chalabi (Ph.D. 1969) – interim Oil Minister and Deputy Prime Minister of Iraq
 Elizabeth Cheney (J.D. 1996) – head of the Iran Syria Policy and Operations Group (ISOG) and daughter of former U.S. Vice President Richard Cheney
 Ramsey Clark (A.M. 1950, J.D. 1951) – Attorney General of the United States (1967–1969)
 Benjamin V. Cohen (Phi Beta Kappa 1913, Ph.B 1914, J.D. 1915) – member of President Franklin D. Roosevelt's brain trust
 James Comey (J.D.) – seventh director of the Federal Bureau of Investigation
 Lycurgus Conner (B.A., J.D.) – member of the Illinois House of Representatives (1961–1963)
 Richard Cordray (J.D. 1986) – 1st Director of the Consumer Financial Protection Bureau, 49th Attorney General of Ohio, 46th Treasurer of Ohio
 Jon S. Corzine (M.B.A. 1973) – Governor of New Jersey (D) (2006–2010); United States Senator (D-NJ) (2001–2006); former Chairman and CEO of Goldman Sachs; University trustee
 Benjamin O. Davis Jr. (X. 1933) – General of the United States Air Force (1954); Assistant Secretary of Transportation under Nixon
 Francisco Gil Diaz (Ph.D. 1972) – Secretary of Finance and Public Credit of Mexico
 James I. Dolliver (J.D. 1921) – Republican U.S. Representative from Iowa's 6th congressional district
 Jon Dudas (J.D.) – Director of the United States Patent and Trademark Office, Under Secretary of Commerce for Intellectual Property
 Troy Eid (J.D. 1991) – United States Attorney for the District of Colorado (2006–2009)
 Frank H. Easterbrook (J.D. 1973) – Circuit Judge, United States Seventh Circuit Court of Appeals
 Allison H. Eid (J.D. 1991) – 95th Justice of the Colorado Supreme Court
 Harvey Feldman (A.B. ?, A.M. 1954) – drafter of the Taiwan Relations Act, United States Ambassador to Papua New Guinea and the Solomon Islands (1979–1981)
 Noel Francisco (B.A. 1991 J.D. 1996) – 47th Solicitor General of the United States
 Jerome Frank (A.B. 1909, J.D. 1912) – legal philosopher, Judge of United States Court of Appeals for the Second Circuit, Chairman of the Securities and Exchange Commission
 Stanton Friedman (B.S. 1955, M.S. 1956) – nuclear physicist, UFOlogist
 Douglas H. Ginsburg (J.D. 1973) – Chief Judge, United States Court of Appeals for the District of Columbia Circuit
 Jackie Goldberg (M.A.T. 1973) – California State Assembly member (2000–2006)
 Paulo Guedes (Ph.D. 1978) – Brazilian Minister of the Economy
 Avril Haines (A.B. 1992) – Deputy Director of the CIA (2013–2015), Deputy National Security Advisor (2015–2017), Director of National Intelligence (2021-present)
 William J. Holloway (A.B. 1910) – 8th Governor of Oklahoma (1929–1931)
 James Hormel (J.D. 1958) – United States Ambassador to Luxembourg (1999–2001)
 Constance Horner (M.A. 1967) – member of the United States Commission on Civil Rights (1993–1998); public official in the Reagan and first Bush administrations, independent director of Pfizer, Prudential Financial, and Ingersoll Rand
 Thomas W. Hyde – major general of volunteers in the American Civil War, Maine state senator, founder of Bath Iron Works
 Harold LeClair Ickes (A.B. 1897 J.D. 1907) – United States Secretary of the Interior (1933–1946)
 Fred Ikle (A.M. 1948, Ph.D. 1950) – former Under Secretary of Defense for Policy; Director of U.S. Arms Control and Disarmament Agency (1973–1977)
 Peter Jambrek (Ph.D. 1971) – President of the Constitutional Court (1991–1993) and Minister of the Interior of Slovenia (2000), member of the European Court for Human Rights (1993–1999)
 Patricia Kabbah (A.M. 1963) – former First Lady of Sierra Leone
 Anne Kaiser  (B.A. 1990) - Member of the Maryland House of Delegates, 2003–present
 Zalmay Khalilzad (Ph.D. 1979) – United States Ambassador to the United Nations (2007–2009); former United States Ambassador to Afghanistan
 Ro Khanna (B.A. 1998) – Member of the United States House of Representatives from California's 17th district 
 Andy Kim (B.A. 2004) – politician and former national security adviser for Barack Obama
 Amy Klobuchar (J.D. 1985) – United States Senate (D-MN) (2007–present)
 Larry Krasner – Federal public defender, running for District Attorney of Philadelphia
 Alexander Krasnoshchyokov (J.D. 1912) – Soviet politician, first Chairman of the Government of the Far Eastern Republic
 Koh Tsu Koon (Ph.D. 1977) – third Chief Minister of the State of Penang, Malaysia (1990–2008)
 Jewel Lafontant (J.D. 1946) – United Nations delegate
 Brad Lander (B.A. 1991) – New York City Council Member, 39th district
 Thomas Rex Lee (J.D. 1991) – Associate Justice of the Utah Supreme Court
 Rex E. Lee (J.D. 1963) – 37th Solicitor General of the United States
 Edward Levi (A.B. 1932, J.D. 1935) – Attorney General of the United States (1975–1977)
 Lori Lightfoot (J.D. 1989) – Mayor of Chicago
 Robert Todd Lincoln (J.D. 1867) – 35th United States Secretary of War
 Lien Chan (Ph.D. 1965) – Vice President of the Republic of China (Taiwan) under President Lee Teng-hui (1996–2000)
 Justin Yifu Lin (Ph.D. 1986) – Senior Vice President and first Chief Economist from a developing country for the World Bank (2008–present)
 T. D. A. Lingo – folk singer, radio personality, and brain researcher
 Ochola Ogaye Mak'Anyengo - Kenyan Trade Unionist and Politician
 Jack Markell (M.B.A. 1985) – Governor of Delaware (2009–2017)
 Michael W. McConnell (J.D. 1979) – Circuit Judge, United States Tenth Circuit Court of Appeals
 David M. McIntosh (J.D. 1983) – Member of the U.S. House of Representatives from Indiana's 2nd district, President of the Club for Growth
 Marco Antonio Mena Rodríguez – Governor-elect of Tlaxcala
 Abner J. Mikva (J.D. 1951) – Illinois Congressman (1956–1966); United States Congressman (1969–1973, 1975–1979); United States Court of Appeals Judge (1979–1994)
 Patsy Mink (J.D. 1951) – United States House of Representatives (D-HI) (1965–1977, 1990–2002)
 Carol Moseley Braun (J.D. 1972) – United States Senate (D-IL) (1992–1998); United States Ambassador (1999–2001)
 Richard A. Mugalian – Illinois state representative and lawyer
 Eliot Ness (A.B. 1925) – United States Treasury and Bureau of Prohibition agent, head of The Untouchables
 William Niskanen (A.M. 1955, Ph.D. 1962) – Chairman of the Cato Institute in Washington, D.C.
 Ajit Pai (J.D. 1997) – Chairman of the Federal Communications Commission (2017–2021)
 James B. Parsons (A.M. 1946, J.D. 1949) – first African-American Federal District Court Judge (1991–1992)
 Peter George Peterson (M.B.A. 1951) – United States Secretary of Commerce (1972–1973)
 Abraham A. Ribicoff (J.D. 1933) – 4th United States Secretary of Health, Education, and Welfare, 80th Governor of Connecticut
 Pete Ricketts (A.B. 1986, M.B.A. 1991) – 40th Governor of Nebraska (2015–2023); United States Senate (R-NE) (2023–present)
 Paul Romer (B.A. 1977, Ph.D. 1983) – Chief Economist of the World Bank
 Kyle Sampson (J.D. 1996) – Chief of Staff and Counselor of United States Attorney General Alberto Gonzales
 Bernie Sanders (A.B. 1964) – United States Senator (VT); United States House of Representatives; 2016 and 2020 presidential candidate
 David Schuman (Ph.D. 1974) – Oregon Court of Appeals Judge
 Masaaki Shirakawa (A.M. 1977) – Governor, Bank of Japan (2008–present)
 Thomas Sowell (Ph.D. 1968) – winner of the National Humanities Medal (2003); economist and Senior Fellow at Hoover Institution, Stanford University
 John Paul Stevens (A.B. 1941) – United States Supreme Court Justice (1975–2010)
 Jim Talent (J.D. 1981) – United States Senator (R-Mo) (2002–2007)
 John Thomas (J.D. 1970) – Lord Chief Justice of England and Wales
 Joe Walsh – conservative talk radio host; former Republican Representative from Illinois's 8th congressional district (M.P.P. 1991)
 Paul Wolfowitz (Ph.D. 1972) – President of the World Bank (2005–2007); United States Deputy Secretary of Defense (2001–2005)
 Todd Young (M.B.A. 2000) – U.S. Senator from Indiana (2017–present) 
 Kateryna Yushchenko (M.B.A. 1986) – First Lady of Ukraine (2005–2010)

Arts and entertainment
 Ed Asner (X. 1948) – Emmy Award-winning actor, The Mary Tyler Moore Show, Lou Grant, Up, Elf
 David Auburn (A.B. 1991) – playwright; winner of the Pulitzer Prize and Tony Award for Proof
 Lester Beall (A.B. 1926) – modernist graphic designer
 Elvin Bishop (X, 1972) – rock musician; blues icon
 JoAnne Carson – painter and sculptor, Guggenheim Fellow (2016)
 Anna Chlumsky (A.B. 2002) – actress; film My Girl and TV series Veep
 Misha Collins (A.B. 1997) – actor; star of TV series Supernatural
 Kahane Cooperman (A.B. 1980) – documentary filmmaker and television producer
 Jan Crull Jr. (A.M. 1984) – documentary filmmaker
 Katherine Dunham (Ph.B. 1936) – dancer and choreographer, National Medal of Arts winner
 Roger Ebert (X. 1970) – film critic and Pulitzer Prize winner
 Kurt Elling (X. 1992) – jazz singer and nine-time Grammy Award nominee
 Jonathan Elliott (Ph.D. 1988) – classical composer
 George R. Ellis (A.B. 1959, M.F.A. 1962) – author, art historian and director of the Honolulu Museum of Art
 David B. Eskind (X. 1934) – radio scriptwriter, producer
 Irwin Leroy Fischer (A.B. 1924) – classical composer, former Dean of Faculty American Conservatory of Music and former principal organist Chicago Symphony Orchestra
 Alyce Frank (1950) – artist
 Melvin Frank (A.B. 1935) – Academy Award-nominated filmmaker and screenwriter, A Touch of Class
 Philip Glass (A.B. 1956) – Academy Award-nominated composer and musician
 Leon Golub (A.B. 1942) – artist
 John Grierson (A.M. 1927) – coined the word "documentary"; founder of the British documentary film movement; founded and headed Canada's National Film Board during World War II; director of mass communications for UNESCO, 1948–50
 Sessue Hayakawa (A.B. 1913) – Academy Award-nominated film actor; starred in Cecil B. DeMille's The Cheat and Bridge on the River Kwai
 Marilu Henner (X. 1974) – actress; starred in TV series Taxi
 Daryl Hine (Ph.D. 1967) – Canadian poet and translator
 Mark Hollmann (A.B. 1985) – Tony Award-winning composer
 Celeste Holm (X. 1934) – Academy Award-winning actress, Gentleman's Agreement, All About Eve, High Society
Irene Whitfield Holmes (Ph.D. 1924) – Ethnomusicologist and collector of French language American folk songs
 Tyehimba Jess (A.B. 1991) – Pulitzer Prize-winning poet
 Rebecca Jarvis (A.B. 2003) – runner-up on the fourth season of The Apprentice
 Wolf Kahn (A.B. 1950) – artist
 Philip Kaufman (A.B. 1958) – film director, The Right Stuff, The Unbearable Lightness of Being
 Rose Kaufman (X. 1959) – screenwriter, The Wanderers and Henry & June
 Greg Kotis (A.B. 1988) – Tony Award-winning playwright
 Leopold and Loeb (attended) – murderers
 Aaron Lipstadt (A.B. 1974) – director
 Joshua Marston (A.M. 1994) – film director, Maria Full of Grace
 Peter Marzio – former director of Museum of Fine Arts, Houston
 Tucker Max (A.B. 1998) – Internet celebrity and New York Times bestselling author
 Elaine May (A.B. 1953) – screenwriter, actress, and director, comedian with Nichols and May, Oscar-nominated writer of Heaven Can Wait and Primary Colors, director of A New Leaf and The Heartbreak Kid
 Amy Meyers (A.B. 1977) - art historian and museum director
 Mike Nichols (X. 1953) – film and stage director; winner of a Tony Award and an Academy Award; directed The Graduate, Who's Afraid of Virginia Woolf?, Catch-22, Silkwood; co-founder of The Second City comedy troupe
 Sheldon Patinkin (A.B. 1953) – theater director
 Kimberly Peirce (A.B. 1990) – film director, Boys Don't Cry (Academy Award for Best Actress, Hilary Swank) and Stop-Loss
 Gordon Quinn (A.B. 1965) – filmmaker, founder of Kartemquin Films
 Dan Peterman – artist
 Bernard Sahlins (A.B. 1943) – co-founder of The Second City comedy troupe
 Hayden Schlossberg (A.B. 2000) – writer, Harold & Kumar Go to White Castle
 Eddie Shin (A.B. 1998) – actor
 Paul Sills (A.B. 1951) – co-founder of The Second City comedy troupe
 David Steinberg – comedian, actor, writer, director, and author
 Michael Stevens – creator of educational YouTube channel Vsauce
 Fritz Weaver (A.B. 1951) – actor, Holocaust, Fail-Safe, Black Sunday
 Gavin Williamson – harpsichordist
 Arthur Zegart – documentary film producer

Athletics
 Jay Berwanger (A.B. 1936) – first Heisman Trophy winner
 Gene Clapp (M.B.A. 1974) – Olympic silver medalist, men's eight rowing
 Willie D. Davis (M.B.A. 1968) – professional football player and former university trustee
 Kim Ng (A.B. 1990) – General Manager of Miami Marlins, former senior vice president of operations with Major League Baseball, former assistant general manager of Los Angeles Dodgers
 Craig Robinson (M.B.A. 1992) – former men's basketball head coach at Oregon State University; older brother of Michelle Obama
 Milton "Mitt" Romney – football player for Chicago Bears; college basketball coach; cousin of former Michigan Governor George W. Romney
 Adam Silver (J.D. 1988) – Commissioner of the National Basketball Association

Business
 Andrew Alper (A.B. 1980, M.B.A., 1981) – President of the New York City Economic Development Corporation, youngest Goldman Sachs partner in company history, university trustee
 Roger Altman (M.B.A. 1969) – founder and senior chairman of Evercore, United States Deputy Secretary of the Treasury
 José Antonio Alvarez (M.B.A. 1996) – vice chairman and CEO of  Santander Group, the largest Eurozone banking group by market value
 Cliff Asness (M.B.A, Ph.D.) – billionaire founder of AQR Capital
 Edward M. Baker (A.B. 1898) – investment broker
 Robert Barnett (J.D. 1971) – partner at the law firm Williams & Connolly LLP
 Bart Becht (M.B.A. 1982) – CEO of Reckitt Benckiser
 Paul G. Blazer (A.A. 1915) – founder of Ashland Oil & Refining Company (Ashland, Inc.)
 David G. Booth (M.B.A. 1971) – billionaire philanthropist, co-CEO and co-founder of Dimensional Fund Advisors
 Bill Browder (A.B. 1985) – CEO of Hermitage Capital Management and human rights activist
 Patrick O. Brown (AB 1976, PhD 1980, MD 1982) – CEO and founder of Impossible Foods
 Debra Cafaro (JD 1982) – Chairman of the Board and Chief Executive Officer of Ventas, minority owner of the Pittsburgh Penguins
 Agustín Carstens (Ph.D. 1985) – Head of the Bank for International Settlements known as "The Bank for Central Banks"; former Governor of Bank of Mexico; current member of Group of Thirty (G-30)
 Tae-won Chey (Ph.D. 1989) – billionaire Chairman of the SK Group, son-in-law of Korean president Roh Tae-woo
 Norton Clapp (Ph.B. 1928, J.D. 1929) – an original owner of Space Needle; university trustee
 William E. Conway Jr. (MBA) – billionaire co-founder of The Carlyle Group
 L. Gordon Crovitz (A.B. 1980) – publisher of The Wall Street Journal
 Daniel Doctoroff (J.D. 1984) – President of Bloomberg L.P.; former Deputy Mayor of New York City under Mayor Michael Bloomberg
 Brady Dougan (A.B. 1981, M.B.A., 1982) – CEO of Credit Suisse First Boston; CEO-elect of Credit Suisse Group in Zurich (beginning May 2007); youngest CEO on Wall Street (2004)
 Arnold W. Donald (M.B.A. 1980) – CEO of Carnival Corporation & plc
 J. Patrick Doyle (M.B.A. 1988) – President and CEO of Domino's Pizza
 Larry Ellison (did not graduate) – billionaire founder of Oracle; reportedly wealthiest person in California, third-richest in United States
 Marcel Erni (M.B.A. 1991) – billionaire co-founder of Partners Group
 Eugene Fama (Ph.D. 1964) – "father of modern finance"; 2013 Nobel Laureate in Economics
 Jacob A. Frenkel (M.A., Ph.D.) – Chairman of JPMorgan Chase International; Chairman of the Board of Trustees of the Group of Thirty (G-30); former David Rockefeller Professor of International Economics at the University of Chicago; former Governor of the Bank of Israel
 Diane Garnick (M.B.A. 2012) – Chief Income Strategist of TIAA (2016–present)
 Gerald Gidwitz (Ph.B. 1927) – co-founder of Helene Curtis Industries, Inc.
 Scott Griffith (M.B.A. 1990) – CEO of Zipcar (2003–present)
 Timothy E. Hoeksema (M.B.A. 1977) – founder of Midwest Airlines
 Gary Hoover – founder of Bookstop and Hoover's
 Mark Hoplamazian (M.B.A. 1989) – CEO, Global Hyatt Corporation (2006–present)
 Daniel Ivascyn (M.B.A. 1998) – CIO of PIMCO
 Kenneth M. Jacobs (B.A. 1980) – Chairman and CEO of Lazard; university trustee
 Stephen A. Jarislowsky (M.A. 1946) – billionaire founder of Jarislowsky Fraser Limited, one of Canada's largest investment management firms
 Porter Jarvis (M.B.A. 1932) – President, then Chairman of Swift & Co., 1955–1967
 John H. Johnson (X. 1942) – founder of Johnson Publishing Company, publisher of Ebony and Jet magazines
 Karen Katen (B.A. Political science, M.B.A.) - pharmaceutical executive
 James M. Kilts (M.B.A. 1974) – Chairman, President, and CEO of Gillette Company; founding partner of Centerview Partners
 Bon-Joon Koo (M.B.A.) – billionaire Vice Chairman of LG Electronics Corporation
 Carlos Langoni (PhD) – former President of the Central Bank of Brazil
 Sherry Lansing (Lab 1962) – Chairman and CEO of Paramount Pictures
 Michael Larson (M.B.A. 1981) – Chief Investment officer of Cascade Investment, the investment vehicle for Bill Gates and his foundation
 John Liew (BA 1989, MBA 1994, PhD 1995) – billionaire co-founder of AQR Capital
 Dave MacLennan (M.B.A.) – CEO of Cargill, the largest privately held corporation in the US
 Dennis Malamatinas (M.B.A. 1979) – former CEO of Burger King, Priceline Europe and Smirnoff.
 Joe Mansueto (A.B. 1978, M.B.A. 1980) – billionaire Chairman and CEO of Morningstar, Inc.
 Harry Markowitz (A.B. 1947, A.M. 1950, Ph.D. 1955) – "father of modern portfolio theory"; 1990 Nobel Laureate in Economics
 Howard Marks (M.B.A. 1969) – billionaire founder of Oaktree Capital Management
 James O. McKinsey (B.Phil 1917, M.A. in Commerce 1919) – Founder of McKinsey & Company; also served on the faculty of University of Chicago
 Peter Mensch (X, 1975, Masters in Marketing) – rock impresario
 John Meriwether (M.B.A. 1973) – CEO and Principal of JWM Partners; former CEO of Long Term Capital Management
 Satya Nadella (M.B.A. 1997) – CEO of Microsoft
 Martin Nesbitt (M.B.A. 1991) – CEO of The Parking Spot, Treasurer of Barack Obama's 2008 presidential campaign
 Joseph Neubauer (M.B.A. 1965) – Chairman and CEO of Aramark
 Victor Niederhoffer (Ph.D. 1969) – hedge fund manager
 John Opel (M.B.A. 1949) – President of IBM (1974–1983); CEO of IBM (1981–1985); Chairman of IBM (1983–1986)
 Ferdinand Peck – businessman and philanthropist, best known for financing Chicago's Auditorium Building
 Peter Peterson (M.B.A. 1951) – billionaire co-founder and former Chairman of Blackstone Group; 20th United States Secretary of Commerce
 Renaud de Planta (M.B.A. 1987) – the sole senior partner of the Pictet Group, a 215-year-old Swiss bank catering to the world's wealthiest individuals
 Matthew Prince (J.D. 2000) — Co-Founder and CEO of Cloudflare
 Anthony Pritzker (M.B.A. 1987) – billionaire member of the Pritzker family; Founder and Managing Partner of the Pritzker Group 
 Donald Pritzker (J.D. 1959) – member of the Pritzker family; former president of Hyatt Corporation
 Nicholas Pritzker (J.D. 1975) – billionaire member of the Pritzker family; former president of Hyatt Corporation and co-founder of Tao Capital
 Thomas Pritzker (J.D./M.B.A. 1976) – billionaire member of the Pritzker family; Chairman and CEO of The Pritzker Organization and Executive Chairman of Hyatt Corporation
 Michael Polsky (M.B.A. 1987) – billionaire founder of Invenergy, a multinational power generation development firm
 Philip J. Purcell (M.B.A. 1967) – former chairman and CEO of Morgan Stanley Dean Witter
 Roberta Cooper Ramo (J.D.) – private practice lawyer, President of the American Law Institute
 Jay Rasulo (M.B.A. 1984) (AM 1982) – Senior Executive Vice President and CFO of The Walt Disney Company
 Samuel Reshevsky (A.B. 1934) – accountant and chess grandmaster
 Laura Ricketts (A.B. 1994) – co-owner of Chicago Cubs, board member of Lambda Legal, gay rights activist
 Pete Ricketts (M.B.A. 1991) – 40th Governor of Nebraska, former COO of TD Ameritrade
 Thomas S. Ricketts (A.B. 1988, M.B.A. 1993) – CEO of Incapital LLC; Director of TD Ameritrade; Chairman of the Chicago Cubs
 David Rockefeller (Ph.D. 1940) – billionaire Chairman of Chase Manhattan Bank (1969–81); former trustee of the University of Chicago
 Emmanuel Roman (M.B.A. 1987) – CEO of PIMCO
 David Rubenstein (J.D. 1973) – billionaire co-founder of The Carlyle Group
 Álvaro Saieh (AM’76, PhD’80) – billionaire chairman of the CorpGroup; seventh richest man in Chile
 Nassef Sawiris (A.B. 1982) – billionaire member of the Sawiris family; CEO of Orascom Construction; sixth richest man in Africa
 Evan Sharp (A.B. 2005) – billionaire co-founder and Chief Creative Officer of Pinterest
 Masaaki Shirakawa (M.A. 1977) – former Governor of the Bank of Japan; current member of the Group of Thirty (G-30)
 Rex Sinquefield (MBA) – billionaire co-founder of Dimensional Fund Advisors
 Patrick Spain (A.B. 1974) – founder of Hoover's and HighBeam Research
 Robert Steel (M.B.A. 1984) – CEO of Wachovia Bank (2008–present); former Vice-Chairman of Goldman Sachs; former Under Secretary for Domestic Finance within the United States Department of the Treasury
 Dick Stoken (M.B.A., 1958) – founding partner in Lind-Waldock, head of Strategic Capital Management
 John Studzinski (M.B.A., 1980) – Vice Chairman of PIMCO, former Vice Chairman of The Blackstone Group, former Head of the European investment banking division and Deputy Chairman of Morgan Stanley
 Marion A. Trozzolo (PhB 1947, M.B.A. 1950) – first United States manufacturer to apply teflon to cookware
 Susan Wagner (M.B.A. 1984) – co-founder, former Vice-Chairman, and COO of BlackRock 
 John S. Watson (M.B.A. 1980) – Chairman and CEO of Chevron Corporation
 Jon Winkelried (A.B. & M.B.A. 1982) – CEO of TPG Capital and former COO of Goldman Sachs
 Changhong Zhu (Ph.D. 1998) – CIO of State Administration of Foreign Exchange manages China's $3.8 trillion reserves

Education
 John Alroy (Ph.D. 1994) – paleobiologist and researcher at the National Center for Ecological Analysis and Synthesis, UCSB, 2007 Charles Schuchert Award from The Paleontological Society
 Eric Ashby, Baron Ashby – former Master of Clare College, Cambridge and Vice-Chancellor of University of Cambridge 
 Richard C. Atkinson (Ph.B. 1948) – President of the University of California (1995–2003)
 Marguerite Ross Barnett (A.M. 1966, Ph.D. 1972) – first African-American and female President of the University of Houston (1990–92); first African-American Chancellor of the University of Missouri (1986–90)
 Werner A. Baum (Ph.D.) – second chancellor of University of Wisconsin–Milwaukee (1973–1979) and the 7th president of University of Rhode Island (1968–1973)
 Laird Bell (J.D.) – lawyer, Chairman of the Chicago Council on Foreign Relations, Chairman of the University of Chicago Board of Trustees, and of Carleton College
 Aaron Ben-Ze'ev (born 1949) – Israeli philosopher and President of the University of Haifa
 Richard J. Bernstein (A.B.) – philosopher, professor of philosophy at the New School for Social Research, former president of the Eastern Division of the American Philosophical Association
 Henry Bienen (A.M. 1962, Ph.D. 1966) – President of Northwestern University (1995–2009)
 George W. Bond (M.A. 1923) – President of Louisiana Tech University, 1928–1936
 Leon Botstein (A.B. 1967) – President of Bard College (1975–present); principal conductor of American Symphony Orchestra
 John W. Boyer (A.M. 1969, Ph.D. 1975) – Dean of the College at the University of Chicago
 Tom Campbell (A.B. 1973, A.M. 1973, Ph.D. 1980) – Dean of Haas School of Business at the University of California, Berkeley (2002–2008)
 King Virgil Cheek (J.D. 1969) – President of Shaw University (1969–1971); President of Morgan State University (1971–1974)
 Rebecca S. Chopp (Ph.D. 1983) – current Chancellor, University of Denver; former President of Swarthmore College; President of Colgate University (2002–2009); former dean of Yale Divinity School; former provost of Emory University; feminist theologian
 John Royston Coleman (Ph.D. 1950) – labor economist; President of Haverford College; former dean of Carnegie-Mellon University; author of Blue-Collar Journal; host of CBS program Money Talks
 May Louise Cowles – economist; researcher, and nationwide advocate of home economics study
 Peter Dorman (Ph.D. 1985) – President, American University of Beirut (2008–present)
 Mary Elizabeth Downey – Director of the Chautauqua School for Librarians who established and promoted library science education courses across the Western and Midwestern United States
 Herman Dreer (Ph.D. 1955) academic administrator, educator, educational reformer and activist, author, editor, minister, and civil rights leader
 Christopher L. Eisgruber (J.D. 1988) – 20th President of Princeton University
 Norman Ericson (Ph.D.) – Bible scholar, faculty at Trinity International University
 Ward Farnsworth (J.D. 1994) – Dean of University of Texas School of Law
 Paul Finkelman (Ph.D. 1976) – President of Gratz College (2017–present)
 Michael Gerhardt (J.D. 1982) – Constitutional Law Professor at UNC School of Law; Special Counsel to the Senate Judiciary Committee for the nominations of Sonia Sotomayor (2009), Elena Kagan (2010), and Neil Gorsuch (2017) to the U.S. Supreme Court
 Benjamin Ginsberg (B.A. 1968, A.M. 1970, Ph.D. 1973) – professor of political science at Johns Hopkins University
 Edgar Godbold (Ph.D. 1907) – President of Howard Payne University in Brownwood, Texas (1923–1929), and Louisiana College in Pineville, Louisiana (1942–1951)
 Marvin L. Goldberger (Ph.D. 1948) – President of California Institute of Technology (1978–1987)
 Clifton Daggett Gray (Ph.D.) – President of Bates College (1920–1944)
 W. G. Hardy (Ph.D. 1922) Professor of Classics of University of Alberta, writer, ice hockey administrator, Member of the Order of Canada
 Carla Hayden (Ph.D. 1977) – 14th Librarian of Congress
 Susan Henking (Ph.D. 1988) – President of Shimer College (2012–present) 
 Laurin L. Henry – academic and educator
 Leo I. Higdon Jr. (M.B.A. 1972) – President of Connecticut College (2006–present); President of the College of Charleston (2001–2006); President of Babson College (1997–2001); Dean of Darden Graduate School of Business Administration at the University of Virginia
 William E. Holmes – former President of Central City College; faculty of the Atlanta Baptist Institute, now called Morehouse College, for 25 years
 Sheila Miyoshi Jager 1994 (PhD): professor of East Asian Studies at Oberlin College
 Howard Wesley Johnson (A.M. 1947) – President of Massachusetts Institute of Technology (1966–1971)
 David Aaron Kessler (J.D. 1978) – Dean of the University of California at San Francisco School of Medicine; former Dean of Yale School of Medicine; former Food and Drug Administration Commissioner
 Robert Kibbee (masters 1947, doctorate 1957) – Chancellor of the City University of New York
 Werner Krieglstein (Ph.D. 1972) – Professor and philosopher; recipient of the CCHA's Distinguished Regional Humanities Educator Award in 2008 and a Fulbright scholar
 Thomas W. Krise (Ph.D. 1995) – 13th President of Pacific Lutheran University (2012–2017)
 H. Gregg Lewis (A.B. 1936, Ph.D. 1947) – professor and labor economist
 Benjamin E. Mays (A.M. 1925, Ph.D. 1935) – President of Morehouse College (1940–1967); recipient of American Educator Award (1980); civil rights activist
 Alice Rebecca Brooks McGuire (Ph.D. 1958) - professor of library science, President of the American Association of School Librarians (1953-1954)
 William Parker McKee (B.Div., 1887) – second president of Shimer College
 Deborah Meier (A.M. 1955) – founder of small schools in New York and Boston; recipient of MacArthur Fellowship
 Jacob (Kobi) Metzer – economic historian, professor, eighth President of the Open University of Israel
 Herman Clarence Nixon – professor, member of the Southern Agrarians
 Daniel Nugent (Ph.D. 1988) - Professor of Anthropology University of Arizona
 Dallin H. Oaks (J.D. 1957) – former President of Brigham Young University
 Edison E. Oberholtzer (A.M. 1915) – founder and first President of the University of Houston
 G. Dennis O'Brien (Ph.D., 1961) – former president of Bucknell University and the University of Rochester
 Leo J. O'Donovan (postdoctoral fellow at University of Chicago) – 47th President of Georgetown University
 Santa J. Ono (A.B. 1984) – 15th President University of Michigan; 15th President & Vice-Chancellor University of British Columbia; 28th President University of Cincinnati
 Vivian Paley (Ph.B. 1947) – teacher and early childhood education researcher
 Don Patinkin (1922–1995)) – Israeli-American economist, and President of the Hebrew University of Jerusalem
 William L. Pollard (Ph.D. 1976) – President of Medgar Evers College (2009–present)
 Clayton Rose (B.A. 1980, M.B.A. 1981) – President of Bowdoin College (2015–present)
 Thomas Sakmar (A.B. Chemistry 1978, M.D. Medicine 1982) – Senior Physician, Professor and former Acting President of The Rockefeller University
 Barbara Snyder (J.D.) – president of Case Western Reserve University
 Gerhard Spiegler – former President of Elizabethtown College
 Samuel L. Stanley (A.B. 1976) – President of Stony Brook University (2009–2019) and Michigan State University (2019–)
 Teresa A. Sullivan (Ph.D.) – sociologist and university administrator, 8th President of the University of Virginia
 Vince Tinto – theorist in field of higher education, particularly concerning university student retention
 David Truman (A.M. 1936, Ph.D. 1939) – President of Mount Holyoke College (1969–1978); President of Russell Sage Foundation (1978–1979)
 Richard R. Wright Jr. – sociologist; President of Wilberforce University

Historians
 Solange Ashby (PhD 2016), egyptologist and nubiologist
 Allan Berube (X. 1968) – founder of the San Francisco Gay and Lesbian History Project, now the Gay and Lesbian Historical Society; author of Coming Out Under Fire (1990) [Lambda Literary Award]; MacArthur Fellow (1996)
 Antoinette Burton (A.M. 1984, Ph.D. 1990) – Catherine A. and Bruce C. Bastian Professor of Global and Transnational Studies and Professor of History at the University of Illinois at Urbana-Champaign
 Henry Steele Commager (Ph.B. 1923, A.M. 1924, Ph.D. 1928) – American historian
 Avery Craven (Ph.D. 1923) – Professor of History; Civil War expert
 Herrlee G. Creel (Ph.B. 1926, A.M. 1927, Ph.D. 1929) – sinologist 
 Frances Gardiner Davenport (Ph.D. 1904) – editor of the series European Treaties Bearing on the History of the United States and its Dependencies
 Angie Debo (A.M. 1924, international relations) – Oklahoma and Native American history, author of And the Waters Still Run: The Betrayal of the Five Civilized Tribes (1940)
 Nicholas Dirks (A.M. 1974, Ph.D. 1981) – Franz Boas Professor of History and Anthropology; Vice-President for Arts and Sciences at Columbia University
 Paul Finkelman (M.A. 1972, Ph.D. 1976) – President William McKinley Distinguished Professor of Law Emeritus, Albany Law School and President of Gratz College; legal historian and author of Supreme Injustice: Slavery in the Nation's Highest Court (2018)
 James L. Fitzgerald (B.A. 1971, M.A. 1974, Ph.D. 1980) – Purandara Das Distinguished Professor of Sanskrit in the Department of Classics, Brown University
 Lawrence M. Friedman (A.B. 1948, J.D. 1951, LL.M. 1953) – Marion Rice Kirkwood Professor of Law at Stanford Law School; legal historian and author of Crime and Punishment in American History
 David Fromkin (A.B. 1950, J.D. 1953) – University Professor of International Relations, History, and Law at Boston University
 Anthony Grafton (A.B. 1971, A.M. 1972, Ph.D. 1975) – Prominent Renaissance historian and Henry Putnam University Professor at Princeton University.
 Vincent Harding (A.M. 1956, Ph.D. 1965) – a scholar of American religion and society
 Gertrude Himmelfarb (Ph.D. 1950) – National Humanities Medal (2004); Professor Emeritus of History at the City University of New York
 Kenneth T. Jackson (A.M. 1963, Ph.D. 1966) – Jacques Barzun Professor of History and the Social Sciences at Columbia University
 Russell Jacoby (S.M. 1978) – Professor in Residence at Department of History, University of California, Los Angeles; author of The Last Intellectuals (1987 [2000])
 KC Johnson (M.A. 1989) – Professor of History at Brooklyn College and the City University of New York, known for his work exposing the facts about the Duke lacrosse case
 John Komlos (Ph.D. 1978) – professor emeritus, University of Munich economic historian and founder of the journal Economics and Human Biology
 Judith Walzer Leavitt (Ph.D. 1966) – Professor Emerita, History of Medicine Department, University of Wisconsin, Madison, author of Typhoid Mary
 Mark Edward Lewis (A.B. 1977, A.M. 1979, Ph.D. 1985) – Kwoh-Ting Li Professor in Chinese Culture, Department of History, Stanford University
 Muhsin Mahdi (A.M., Ph.D.) – Iraqi-American islamologist and Arabist, James Richard Jewett Professor of Arabic at Harvard University
 Walter A. McDougall (A.M. 1971, Ph.D. 1974) – Professor of History and Alloy-Ansin Professor of International Relations, University of Pennsylvania; Pulitzer Prize Winner (1986)
 William Hardy McNeill (A.B. 1938, A.M. 1939) – Professor Emeritus of History at the University of Chicago; author of The Rise of the West: A History of the Human Community (1963)
 John Victor Murra (A.M. 1942, Ph.D. 1956) – prominent anthropologist and researcher of the Incan Empire
 Saul K. Padover (Ph.D. 1932) – historian and political scientist at the New School for Social Research in New York City
 Richard Anthony Parker (Ph.D. 1938) – Charles Edwin Wilbour Professor of Egyptology at Brown University; director of the University of Chicago's epigraphic survey studying the mortuary temple of Ramses III
 Rick Perlstein (B.A. 1992) – author of Nixonland: The Rise of a President and the Fracturing of America and Before the Storm: Barry Goldwater and the Unmaking of the American Consensus
 Vijay Prashad (A.M. 1990, Ph.D. 1994) – George and Martha Kellner Chair in South Asian History and Professor of International Studies, Trinity College; author of The Darker Nations: A People's History of the Third World (2007)
 Nicolas Rasmussen (A.M. 1986) – Professor of History at the University of New South Wales
 Francesca Rochberg (Ph.D. 1980) – Catherine and William L. Magistretti Distinguished Professor of Near Eastern Studies, University of California, Berkeley; MacArthur Fellow (1982)
 Ovid R. Sellers (A.B. 1904) – Old Testament scholar and archaeologist who played a role in the discovery of the Dead Sea Scrolls
 Gertrude Smith (BA 1916, MA 1917, PhD 1921) Edwin Olson Professor of Greek (1933–1961) and chair of the Department of Classics (1934–1961)
 Eileen Southern (A.B. 1940, A.M. 1941) – National Humanities Medal (2001); first African-American female professor at Harvard University
 Studs Terkel (Ph.B. 1932, J.D. 1934) – oral historian and radio host; Pulitzer Prize winner for the Good War: An Oral History of World War II (1985); National Humanities Medal (1997)
 Richard H. Timberlake (Ph.D. 1957)- economist, author, and economic historian.
 Gerhard Weinberg (A.M. 1949, Ph.D. 1951) – historian, World War II expert; William R. Kenan Jr. Professor Emeritus of History, University of North Carolina, Chapel Hill
 Irene J. Winter (M.A. 1967) – Ancient Near East Art historian, professor at Harvard and chair of the department of Fine Arts from 1993 to 1996; MacArthur Fellow (1983), Radcliffe Fellow (2003–04), Mellon Lecturer (2005)
 Carter G. Woodson (A.B. 1908, A.M. 1908) – historian and founder of Negro History Week (1926), which evolved into Black History Month; civil rights activist
Chen Hengzhe (M.A) - writer of modern vernacular Chinese literature

Journalism
 Rick Atkinson (A.M. 1976) – reporter and author, four-time Pulitzer Prize winner
 David Blum (A.B. 1977) – Editor in Chief of the Village Voice (2006–present)
 David Broder (A.B. 1947, A.M. 1951) – Pulitzer Prize winner for commentary (1973); political correspondent and columnist for The Washington Post
 David Brooks (A.B. 1983) – political commentator; columnist for The New York Times; senior editor of The Weekly Standard; regular commentator on The NewsHour with Jim Lehrer
 Ana Marie Cox (A.B. 1994) – liberal columnist, founding editor of the Wonkette blog, correspondent for Air America Media
 Roger Ebert (X. 1970) – Pulitzer Prize winner for film criticism (1975); columnist for the Chicago Sun-Times
 Zilfa Estcourt (A.M. 1905) – newspaper columnist and editor at the Tacoma Tribune and San Francisco Chronicle
 Thomas Frank (A.M. 1989, Ph.D. 1994) – Editor-in-Chief of The Baffler; author of The Conquest of Cool (1997) and What's the Matter with Kansas? (2004)
 Janet Flanner – writer and journalist who served as the Paris correspondent of The New Yorker magazine from 1925 until she retired in 1975
 Katharine Graham (A.B. 1938) – publisher of The Washington Post for over two decades; Pulitzer Prize winner for her memoir Personal History (1998)
 Virginia Graham (A.S. 1934) – television news correspondent; prosecution witness in the Tate-LaBianca murders trial
 Jan Crawford Greenburg (J.D. 1993) – chief legal correspondent for CBS News
 Nathan Hare (A.M. 1957, Ph.D. 1962) – author, activist, and sociologist; founding publisher of The Black Scholar, later cited as "the most important journal devoted to black issues since the Crisis" by The New York Times
 Seymour Hersh (A.B. 1958) – Pulitzer Prize-winning investigative journalist and author, most famous for exposing the My Lai Massacre, which greatly changed public opinion of the Vietnam War; frequent contributor to The New Yorker
 Daniel Hertzberg (A.B. 1968) – Pulitzer Prize winner 1988; Managing Editor of The Wall Street Journal
 DeWitt John (A.M. 1937) American journalist and editor
 Richard Lloyd Jones (LL.B. 1897, LL.M. 1898) – longtime publisher of the Tulsa Tribune
 Dave Kehr (A.B. 1975) – film critic for The New York Times
 Sarah Koenig (A.B. 1990) – creator of the award-winning Serial podcast
 Tal Kopan (A.B.) – political reporter for CNN
 Harvey Levin (J.D. 1975) – Managing Editor of TMZ.com
 Roderick MacLeish (A.B. 1947) – National Public Radio political commentator; journalist and author
 John G. Morris (A.B. 1937) – photo editor for Life, Ladies' Home Journal, The Washington Post, The New York Times, National Geographic
 Greg Palast (A.B. 1974, M.B.A. 1976) – progressive investigative journalist
 John Podhoretz (A.B. 1982) – conservative commentator for the National Review, the New York Post, and The Weekly Standard
 Joshua Cooper Ramo (A.B. 1992) – former foreign editor, Time Magazine; managing director, Kissinger Associates
 David E. Reed (A.B. 1946) – roving editor, Reader's Digest; author, 111 Days in Stanleyville (1965); Up Front in Vietnam (1967); Save the Hostages (1988)
 Emmett Rensin – contributor to the Los Angeles Times Opinion Blog, USA Today, Salon, the New Republic, and the Los Angeles Review of Books
 Edward Rothstein (Ph.D. 1994) – cultural critic at The New York Times; former music critic at the New Republic and The New York Times
 Nate Silver (A.B. 2000) – sabermetrician and inventor of PECOTA; writer for Baseball Prospectus; and founder of FiveThirtyEight.com
 Robert B. Silvers (A.B. 1947) – co-founding editor of The New York Review of Books
 Brent Staples (A.M. 1976, Ph.D. 1982) – editorial writer for The New York Times (1990–present); winner of the Anisfield-Wolf Book Award for his memoir Parallel Time: Growing Up in Black and White (1994)
 Bret Stephens (A.B. 1995) – foreign-affairs columnist and deputy editorial page editor of The Wall Street Journal; winner of the 2013 Pulitzer Prize for Commentary
 Ray Suarez (A.M. 1993) – host of Inside Story on Al Jazeera America, former senior correspondent on The NewsHour with Jim Lehrer
 Kenneth Allen Taylor (Ph.D. 1984) – co-host of radio program Philosophy Talk; Professor of Philosophy, Stanford University
 Neda Ulaby (A.M. 1996) – National Public Radio reporter

Literature
 Jessica Abel (A.B. 1991) – comic book writer and artist
 Saul Bellow (X. 1939) – author, Pulitzer Prize winner and Nobel Prize winner
 Allan Bloom (Ph.B. 1949, A.M. 1953, Ph.D. 1955) – author
 Paul C. Borgman (Ph.D. 1973) – religious author and professor
 Dmitri Borgmann (Ph.B.) – writer
 Alice C. Browning (Ph.B. 1931) — writer, editor of Negro Story (1944–1946)
 Ernest Callenbach (Ph.B. 1949, A.M. 1953) – writer
 Bonnie Jo Campbell (A.B. 1984) – novelist and short story writer
 Paul Carroll (A.M. 1952) – poet
 Hayden Carruth (A.M. 1947) – winner of National Book Award in poetry
 Robert Coover (A.M. 1965) – novelist and short story writer
 Will Cuppy (Ph.B. 1907, A.M. 1914) – humorist
 Mu Dan (A.M. 1951) – Chinese poet and literary translator
 Sebastian de Grazia (A.B. 1944, Ph.D. 1948) – Pulitzer Prize winner
 Caitlin Doughty – mortician, author, and promoter of death acceptance
 Phyllis Eisenstein – author of science fiction and fantasy short stories and novels
 Joseph Epstein (A.B. 1959) – essayist, literary critic, and short story writer
 James T. Farrell (X. 1929) – novelist, short story writer, journalist, travel writer, poet and literary critic
 Richard Garfinkle (X. 1980) – science fiction and fantasy author, author of Celestial Matters
 Paul Goodman (Ph.D. 1954) – social critic
 Gerald Graff (A.B. 1959) – president-elect of the Modern Language Association (2008)
 Katharine Graham (A.B. 1938) – author, Pulitzer Prize winner
 Sam Greenlee (1954–57) – writer, author of The Spook Who Sat by the Door
 Bette Howland (A.B. 1955) – writer, literary critic, MacArthur Fellow
 Fenton Johnson – poet
 Cyril M. Kornbluth – science fiction author
 Patrick Larkin (A.B. 1982) – author of espionage, military, and historical thrillers
 Stephen Leacock (Ph.D. 1903) – Canadian humourist and professor of economics at McGill University
 Luis Leal (A.B. 1941, Ph.D. 1950) – literary scholar and winner of National Humanities Medal
 Seth Lerer (Ph.D. 1981) – former Stanford professor; Dean of Arts and Humanities at the University of California, San Diego (2009–2014)
 Naomi Lindstrom (A.B. 1971) – Latin American literary critic
 Jackson Mac Low (A.A. 1943) – poet, winner of Wallace Stevens award
 Norman Maclean (Ph.D. 1940) – William Rainey Harper Professor of English at the University of Chicago, author of A River Runs Through It
 Tom Mandel – contemporary poet whose work is often associated with the language poets
 Campbell McGrath (A.B. 1984) – poet, MacArthur Fellow
 Susan Murphy-Milano (B.A. 1981) – non-fiction author and victims' advocate
 Sterling North (A.B. 1929) – children's author
 Norman Panama (A.B. 1936) – screenwriter and film director
 Sara Paretsky (A.M. 1969, M.B.A. 1977, Ph.D. 1977) – crime novelist
 Elizabeth Peters (Ph.B. 1947, A.M. 1950, Ph.D. 1952) – mystery author
 Joseph G. Peterson (A.B. 1988) – author and poet
 Robert Pirsig (attended but did not graduate) – philosopher, author of Zen and the Art of Motorcycle Maintenance and Lila: An Inquiry into Morals
 Edouard Roditi – writer and translator
 Richard Rorty (A.B. 1949, A.M. 1952) – Professor of Philosophy and Comparative Literature at Stanford University; MacArthur Fellow
 Leo Rosten (Ph.B. 1930, Ph.D. 1937) – humorist
 Philip Roth (A.M. 1955) – author, Pulitzer Prize and National Medal of Arts winner
 Aram Saroyan (X c.1965) – writer, poet, and dramatist, author of famous minimalist poems such as "lighght"
 John Scalzi (B.A. 1991) – novelist
 Susan Fromberg Schaeffer (B.A. 1961, M.A. 1963, Ph.D. 1966) – novelist, poet and professor
 Susan Sontag (A.B. 1951) – author, filmmaker and activist, MacArthur Fellow
 George Steiner (A.B. 1948) – literary critic
 Carl Van Vechten (1903) – writer of novels such as Nigger Heaven and prolific portrait photographer
 Herman Voaden (X) – playwright and social activist
 Kurt Vonnegut Jr. (A.M. 1971) – author of Cat's Cradle, Slaughterhouse-Five, Breakfast of Champions
 Cecelia Watson (A.M. 2005, Ph.D. 2011) - nonfiction author and academic
 Edward F. Wente (Ph.D. 1959) – professor and Egyptologist
 Yvor Winters (attended) – poet and critic
 Marguerite Young – novelist and poet

Mathematics
 Abraham Adrian Albert (B.S. 1926, S.M. 1927, Ph.D. 1928)
 George Birkhoff (Ph.D. 1907) – Bôcher Memorial Prize winner
 Archie Blake (S.M. 1931, Ph.D. 1937)
 Gilbert Ames Bliss (Ph.D. 1900)
 Alberto Calderón (Ph.D. 1950) – co-founded the Chicago school of mathematical analysis; winner of Bôcher Memorial Prize, the Wolf Prize, and the National Medal of Science
 Wei-Liang Chow (B.A. 1931) – known for work in algebraic geometry
 Paul J. Cohen (S.M. 1954, Ph.D. 1958) – Fields Medal winner
 William Dembski (Ph.D. 1988)
 David Eisenbud (Ph.D. 1970)
 Bernard Galler (Ph.D. 1955)
 Murray Gerstenhaber (MA and Ph.D. 1951) – mathematician and lawyer
 Richard Hamming (B.S. 1947) – Turing Award winner
 Thomas W. Hungerford (Ph.D. 1963)
 John Irwin Hutchinson (Ph.D. 1896)
 Ernest Preston Lane (Ph.D. 1918)
 Richard Lyons
 Saunders MacLane (A.M. 1931) – co-founder of category theory
Janet McDonald (mathematician), (Ph.D. 1943)
 Anil Nerode (Ph.D. 1956)
 Alice Turner Schafer (Ph.D. 1942)
 Richard D. Schafer (Ph.D. 1942)
 Isadore Singer (Ph.D. 1955) – Abel Prize winner
 Elias M. Stein (Ph.D. 1959)
 John Thompson (Ph.D. 1959) – world leader in group theory, Fields Medal and National Medal of Science winner
 Oswald Veblen (Ph.D. 1903)
 George W. Whitehead (Ph.D. 1941)
 Dudley Weldon Woodard (M.S. 1907)

Medicine
 Charles F. Barlow (B.S. 1945, M.D. 1947) – pediatric neurologist and professor at Harvard Medical School
 Robert Gallo (Resident in Medicine 1963–1965) – identified first retrovirus in humans
 Maurice Hilleman (Ph.D. 1941) – leading microbiologist specialising in vaccinology, whose vaccines save nearly 8 million lives each year
 Donald Hopkins (M.D. 1966) – MacArthur Fellow (1995); acting director (1985) of the Centers for Disease Control
 Kathy Hudson (MSc) – microbiologist specializing in science policy
 John D. Hunter 2004 – neurobiologist
 Sarah H. Kagan – Lucy Walker Honorary Term Professor of Gerontological Nursing at the University of Pennsylvania; MacArthur Fellow in 2003
 Leon Kass (S.B. 1958, M.D. 1962) – Chairman of the President's Council on Bioethics; Addie Clark Harding Professor in the Committee on Social Thought; Hertog Fellow in Social Thought at the American Enterprise Institute
 Anne L. Peters –   physician, diabetologist and professor of clinical medicine at the Keck School of Medicine of USC
 Joseph Ransohoff (M.D. 1941) – pioneer in the field of neurosurgery; founder of the first neurosurgical intensive care unit; chief of neurosurgery at NYU Medical Center
 Maurice H. Rees – medical educator, Dean of University of Colorado School of Medicine 1925–1945
 Janet Rowley (Ph.B. 1944, S.B. 1946, M.D. 1948) – discovered translocation on chromosome 9 resulted in the Philadelphia chromosome, and had implications for specific types of leukemia; her work has influenced further research into cancer genetics
 Esther Somerfeld-Ziskind – neurologist and psychiatrist
 Samuel Stanley – MD, immunologist, biomedical researcher and 5th President of Stony Brook University
 David Talmage – Professor of Medicine, discovered the clonal selection theory

Religion
 Thomas J. J. Altizer (A.B. 1948, A.M. 1951, Ph.D. 1955) – "Death of God" theologian
 M. Craig Barnes (Ph.D. 1992) – president of Princeton Theological Seminary
 George Ricker Berry (Ph.D. 1895) – Semitic scholar, author, archaeologist, and Professor Emeritus of Colgate-Rochester Divinity School
 Nigel Biggar (A.M. 1980, Ph.D. 1986) – Regius Professor of Moral and Pastoral Theology at the University of Oxford
 Jonathan Butler (Ph.D. 1975) – historian of religion, lecturer for the Seventh-day Adventist Church
 Donald Eric Capps (M.A. 1966, Ph.D. 1970) – scholar and Professor of Pastoral Theology
 Jesse Lee Cuninggim – Methodist clergyman, head of the Department of Religious Education at Southern Methodist University and moved the Scarritt College from Kansas City, Missouri to Nashville, Tennessee as its president
 Frederick William Danker (Ph.D.) – New Testament lexicographer, editor of Bauer's Lexicon, professor at Concordia Seminary, Seminex, and Lutheran School of Theology at Chicago
 Mary Ann Glendon (A.B. 1959, J.D. 1961, L.L.M. 1963) – President of the Pontifical Academy of Social Sciences (highest-ranking female advisor to the Pope); Learned Hand Professor of Law, Harvard Law School; member of the President's Council on Bioethics
 Andrew Greeley (A.M. 1961, Ph.D. 1962) – Senior Study Director at the National Opinion Research Center; Roman Catholic priest; sociologist; best-selling novelist
 Charles Richmond Henderson (Old University A.B. 1870) – sociologist of religion, president of the National Prison Association
 Don Wendell Holter (Ph.D. 1934) – Professor of Church History and Missions at Garrett Theological Seminary; founding President of Saint Paul School of Theology; Bishop of the United Methodist Church
 Vernon Johns –civil rights activist, pastor of Dexter Avenue Baptist Church
 Jeffrey Kaplan (Ph.D. 1993) – Associate Professor of Religion at the University of Wisconsin–Oshkosh
 Douglas Laycock (J.D.) – Professor at the University of Virginia School of Law, expert of religious liberties
 Felix A. Levy (Ph.D. 1917) – Rabbi of Emanuel Congregation
 Jeffery D. Long (A.M. 1993, PhD 2000) – Hindu expert and author of A Vision for Hinduism: Beyond Hindu Nationalism
 Martin Marty (Ph.D. 1956) – National Humanities Medal (1997); national figure in non-sectarian religious studies
 Ingrid Mattson (Ph.D. 1999) – first female president of Islamic Society of North America; professor of religion at Hartford Seminary
 John Warwick Montgomery (Ph.D. 1962) – lawyer, theologian and academic known for his work in the field of Christian Apologetics
 David Novak (A.B. 1961) – Jewish legal theorist at the University of Toronto; a founder of the Institute of Traditional Judaism; author of Covenantal Rights
 Dallin H. Oaks (J.D. 1957) – Apostle; member of the Quorum of the Twelve Apostles of The Church of Jesus Christ of Latter-day Saints (LDS Church)
 Jaroslav Pelikan (Ph.D. 1946) – historian of Christian thought; Sterling Professor of History at Yale University; winner of Library of Congress' Kluge Prize in the Human Sciences; author of The Christian Tradition: A History of the Development of Doctrine
 Mordecai Waxman (A.B. 1937) – rabbi in American Jewish Conservative movement, responsible for opening dialogue between American Jews and Pope John Paul II in 1987

Social sciences
 Janet L. Abu-Lughod (A.B. 1947, A.M. 1950) – Professor Emerita of Sociology at the New School for Social Research
 Guillermo Algaze (A.M. 1979, Ph.D. 1986) – MacArthur Fellow (2003); Professor of Anthropology at the University of California, San Diego
 Anne Allison (A.M. 1979, Ph.D. 1986) – Robert O. Keohane Professor of Cultural Anthropology, Duke University
 Alfred C. Aman Jr. (J.D. 1970) – professor of administrative law; author; Dean of Indiana University Maurer School of Law - Bloomington and Suffolk University Law School
 Elijah Anderson (A.M. 1972) – William K. Lanman Jr. Professor of Sociology, Yale University
 Arjun Appadurai (A.M. 1973, Ph.D. 1976) – Goddard Professor of Media, Culture, and Communication, New York University
 Robert Axelrod (A.B. 1964) – MacArthur Fellow (1990); Professor of Public Policy, University of Michigan
 Howard S. Becker (Ph.B. 1946, A.M. 1949, Ph.D. 1951) – former Professor of Sociology at Northwestern University and the University of California, Santa Barbara
 Walter Berns (A.M. 1951, Ph.D. 1953) – National Humanities Medal (2005); John M. Olin University Professor Emeritus at Georgetown University
 Lorenzo Bini Smaghi (Ph.D. 1988) – member of the Executive Board of the European Central Bank; economist
 Sophonisba Breckinridge (JD, 1904) – Dean of the College of Arts, Literature, and Science, University of Chicago
 Keiichiro Kobayashi (Ph.D. 1998) – Professor of Faculty of Economics, Keio University
 Leonard Bloomfield – linguist who led the development of structural linguistics
 Larry Bourne (Ph.D. 1966) – Professor Emeritus of Urban Geography and Planning, University of Toronto
 Michael Burawoy (Ph.D. 1976) – Professor of Sociology, University of California, Berkeley
 Lynton K. Caldwell (A.B. 1934, Ph.D. 1943) – Arthur F. Bentley Professor Emeritus of Political Science at Indiana University Bloomington
 Stephen Cameron (Ph.D. 1996) – financial analyst, economist and Adjunct Associate Professor of International and Public Affairs at Columbia University
 Marvin Chirelstein (J.D. 1953) – Professor at Columbia Law School and Yale Law School
 Gregory Chow (A.M. 1952, Ph.D. 1955) – Professor of Economics, Emeritus, and Class of 1913 Professor of Political Economy, Emeritus, at Princeton University
 L. Zenobia Coleman (1898-1999) - librarian
 Ann Weiser Cornell (Ph.D. 1975) – authority on focusing; author of The Power of Focusing
Carol Blanche Cotton (Ph.D. 1939) – early African-American female psychologist
 Mihály Csíkszentmihályi (A.B. 1960, Ph.D. 1965) – C.S. and D.J. Davidson Professor of Psychology and Management, Claremont Graduate University; pioneer of the concept of flow
 Werner J. Dannhauser (Ph.D. 1971) – Professor of Government at Cornell University and Michigan State University, expert on Nietzsche and on Judaism and politics
 Nicholas de Genova (A.B. 1982, Ph.D. 1989) – Assistant Professor of Anthropology, Columbia University
 Stefanie DeLuca (A.B. 1998) – Professor of Sociology at Johns Hopkins University; author of Coming of Age in the Other America
 Paul Ekman – professor emeritus at the University of California, San Francisco, pioneer in the study of emotions and their relation to facial expressions
 Eugene Fama (Ph.D. 1964) – father of efficient market theory. Robert R. McCormick Distinguished Service Professor of Finance at the University of Chicago
 Marianne Ferber (Ph.D.) – Professor Emeritus of Economics at University of Illinois at Urbana-Champaign
 George P. Fletcher (J.D. 1964) – Professor at Columbia Law School
 Roland G. Fryer Jr. – Henry Lee Professor of Economics at Harvard University
 Marc Galanter (J.D.) – Professor Emeritus at University of Wisconsin School of Law
 Alexander L. George (A.M. 1941, Ph.D. 1958) – MacArthur Fellow (1983); Graham H. Stuart Professor of International Relations, Emeritus, Stanford University; pioneering scholar in political psychology and foreign policy
 Erving Goffman (A.M. 1949, Ph.D. 1953) – former Professor of Sociology at the University of California, Berkeley and the University of Pennsylvania
 Claudia Goldin (Ph.D. 1972) – Henry Lee Professor of Economics at Harvard University
 Zvi Griliches (A.M. 1955, Ph.D. 1957) – John Bates Clark Medalist (1965); economist
 Sanford J. Grossman (A.B. 1973, A.M. 1974, Ph.D. 1975) – John Bates Clark Medalist (1987); economist
 Daniel S. Hamermesh (B.A. 1965) – Professor Emeritus of Economics at the University of Texas at Austin
 Charles V. Hamilton (A.M. 1957, Ph.D. 1964) – civil rights leader and Professor in Political Science, Columbia University
 Robin Hanson (A.M. 1984, M.S. 1984) – associate professor of economics at George Mason University, research associate at the Future of Humanity Institute of Oxford University
 Edward C. Hayes (Ph.D. 1902) – President of the American Sociological Association
 Susanna Hecht (A.B. 1972) – Professor of Urban Planning, UCLA; a founder of "Political Ecology" approach to forestry; Guggenheim Fellow (2008)
 Carolyn Heinrich (Ph.D. 1995) – Sid Richardson Professor and economist at University of Texas at Austin
 Ukshin Hoti (1943–1999?) – professor of international law at the University of Pristina
 Michael Hudson (born 1939) - economics professor
 Samuel P. Huntington (A.M. 1948) – Albert J. Weatherhead Professor of Government at Harvard University; author of The Clash of Civilizations (1998)
 Harold Innis – founder of the Toronto School of Communication
 Robert Kates (A.M. 1960, Ph.D. 1962) – MacArthur Fellow (1981); Professor Emeritus of Geography and Director Emeritus of the World Hunger Program at Brown University
 Vytautas Kavolis – sociologist, literary critic, and cultural historian
 Frances Kellor – social reformer and sociologist, specializing in immigrants' rights
 V. O. Key Jr. (Ph.D. 1934) – taught at UCLA, Professor at Johns Hopkins University, Alfred Cowles Professor of Government at Yale University, Jonathan Trumbull Professor of American History and Government at Harvard University
 Bruce M. King (Ph.D. 1978) – psychologist and professor at Clemson University
 John Komlos (Ph.D. 1978) – professor emeritus, University of Munich economic historian and founder of the journal Economics and Human Biology
 Rose Hum Lee (Ph.D. 1947) – first woman and first Chinese American to head a US university sociology department, appointed such at Roosevelt University, 1956
 Charles Miller Leslie – anthropologist
 Frederick B. Lindstrom (Ph.D. 1950) – sociologist and historian of the Chicago School of sociology
 Julie Beth Lovins (Ph.D. 1973) – computational linguist who developed the first stemming algorithm for word matching
 Antonio Martino (Ph.D. 1968) – Professor of Economics at LUISS Guido Carli University in Rome, former Italian Ministry of Defense
 Vivian Carter Mason (A.B. 1925) – gender and civil rights advocate
 Adeline Masquelier (Ph.D. 1993) – cultural anthropologist at Tulane University
 Nolan McCarty (A.B. 1990) – Susan Dod Brown Professor of Politics and Public Affairs at Princeton University
 Thomas W. Merrill (J.D. 1977) – Charles Evans Hughes professor at Columbia Law School 
 Richard Thacker Morris (Ph.D.) – Professor of Sociology at the University of Chicago and the UCLA
 Kevin M. Murphy (Ph.D. 1986) – John Bates Clark Medalist (1997); George J. Stigler Professor of Economics, University of Chicago
 John V. Murra (A.M. 1942, Ph.D. 1956) – anthropologist and researcher of the Inca Empire
 Marc Leon Nerlove (A.B. 1952) – John Bates Clark Medalist (1969); economist
 Esther Newton (A.M. 1964, Ph.D. 1968) – Kempner Distinguished Research Professor of Anthropology at SUNY; pioneer in gender and sexuality studies; author of Mother Camp
 Harold L. Nieburg (Ph.B. 1947, A.M. 1952, Ph.D. 1960) – Professor of Political Science at SUNY; author of In the Name of Science
 Anne Norton (A.B. 1977, A.M. 1979, Ph.D. 1982) – Alfred L. Cass Term Chair and Professor of Political Science, University of Pennsylvania; author of Leo Strauss and the Politics of American Empire (2004)
 Sherry Ortner (A.M. 1966, Ph.D. 1970) – MacArthur Fellow (1990); Distinguished Professor of Anthropology, University of California, Los Angeles
 Walter Oi (Ph.D. 1961) – Elmer B. Milliman Professor of Economics at the University of Rochester
 William Padula (M.Sc. 2015) – professor of Pharmaceutical & Health Economics, University of Southern California
 George L. Priest (J.D.) – John M. Olin Professor of Law and Economics and Director of the John M. Olin Center for Law, Economics, and Public Policy at Yale Law School
 Enrico Quarantelli (Ph.D. 1959) – founder of disaster science
 Paul Rabinow (A.B. 1965, A.M. 1967, Ph.D. 1970) – Robert H. Lowie Distinguished Chair in Anthropology, University of California, Berkeley
 Renee Rabinowitz (A.M. 1969, Ph.D. 1974) – psychologist and lawyer
 Amien Rais (Ph.D. 1984) – professor; former Chairman of the People's Consultative Assembly (MPR) of the Republic of Indonesia
 Jonathan Rapping (A.B.) – professor of law at Atlanta's John Marshall Law School and Harvard Law School, criminal defense attorney, founder and president of Gideon's Promise, MacArthur Fellow (2014)
 Albert Rees (Ph.D. 1950) – former University of Chicago and Princeton economics professor, former Provost at Princeton, advisor to President Gerald Ford
 James M. Redfield (A.B. 1954, Ph.D. 1961) – Edward Olson Distinguished Service Professor and Professor of the Committee on Social Thought at the University of Chicago (1976–present)
 Harriet Lange Rheingold (Ph.D. 1955) – developmental psychologist and professor at University of North Carolina at Chapel Hill
 Philip Rieff (A.B. 1946, A.M. 1947, Ph.D. 1954) – Benjamin Franklin Professor of Sociology at the University of Pennsylvania; author of Freud: The Mind of the Moralist (1959); sociologist
 Lawrence Rosen (Ph.D. 1968, J.D. 1974) – William Nelson Cromwell Professor of Anthropology at Princeton University; Adjunct Professor of Law at Columbia University
 Philip Carl Salzman (Ph.D. 1972) – Professor of Anthropology, McGill University
 Paul Samuelson (A.B. 1935) – Institute Professor, MIT. Bank of Sweden Prize in Economics in Memory of Alfred Nobel, 1970
 Ritch Savin-Williams (A.M. 1973, Ph.D. 1977) – Professor of developmental psychology at Cornell University; prolific sexual orientation researcher
 Thomas Sebeok (A.B. 1941, A.M. 1943) – semiotician and linguist
 Richard Sennett (A.B. 1964) – Centennial Professor of Sociology at the London School of Economics, Bemis Adjunct Professor of Sociology at MIT, and Professor of Humanities at New York University
 Richard B. Spencer (A.M. 2003) – white supremacist, alt-right leader
 Orin Starn (A.B. 1982) – Sally Dalton Robinson Professor of Cultural Anthropology, Duke University
 Daniel Stokols (A.B. 1969) – Chancellor's Professor Emeritus of Social Ecology, University of California, Irvine
 Edwin Sutherland (Ph.D. 1913) – former Professor of Sociology at Indiana University
 Robert Thompson (A.B. 1981) – director of Syracuse University's Center for the Study of Popular Television
 Reeta Chowdhari Tremblay (Ph.D. 1990) – professor of Political Science and former Provost, University of Victoria
 Jeffrey K. Tulis (Ph.D. 1982) - Professor of Government and Law, The University of Texas at Austin
 Jonathan Turley (A.B. 1983) – professor of law at The George Washington University Law School
 Sudhir Venkatesh (A.M. 1992, Ph.D. 1997) – William B. Ransford Professor of Sociology, Columbia University
 Loïc Wacquant (A.M. 1986, Ph.D. 1994) – MacArthur Fellow (1997); Professor of Sociology, University of California, Berkeley
 John M. Wallace Jr. (A.M. 1987) – Professor of Sociology, University of Pittsburgh
 Althea Warren – President of the American Library Association 1943–1944
 John B. Watson (Ph.D. 1903) – established behaviorism and pioneered rat-in-maze laboratory research
 Mildred Mott Wedel (M.A. 1938) – scholar of Great Plains archaeology and ethnohistory
 James Q. Wilson (A.M. 1957, Ph.D. 1959) – Ronald Reagan Professor of Public Policy at Pepperdine University; Presidential Medal of Freedom recipient (2003)
 Michael Woodford (A.B. 1977) – MacArthur Fellow (1981); Professor of Economics, Princeton University
 Henry Tutwiler Wright (A.M. 1965, Ph.D. 1967) – MacArthur Fellow (1983); Professor of Anthropology and Curator of Archaeology, University of Michigan
 Theodore O. Yntema (Ph.D. 1929) – economist, director of the Cowles Commission

Science and technology
 Robert McCormick Adams (Ph.B. 1947, A.M. 1952, Ph.D. 1956) – archeologist. Secretary Emeritus of the Smithsonian Institution
 Warder Clyde Allee (S.M. 1910, Ph.D. 1912) – zoologist and ecologist
 Abhay Ashtekar (Ph.D. 1974) – pioneer in the field of loop quantum gravity
 Zonia Baber – geographer and geologist
 John N. Bahcall (S.M. 1957) – known for contributions to solar neutrino problem and development of the Hubble Space Telescope, and development of Institute for Advanced Study in Princeton
 Asish Basu (M.Sc. 1969) - geologist, Professor Emeritus of Earth and Environmental Sciences at the University of Texas at Arlington
 Ralph Buchsbaum (Ph.D. 1938) – invertebrate zoologist
 Facundo Bueso Sanllehí (M.S. 1929) – Guggenheim Fellow, physicist and educator
 Albert Chan (Ph.D. 1979) – fellow of the Chinese Academy of Sciences, president of Hong Kong Baptist University
 Jane C. Charlton (M.S. 1984) – professor of astronomy and astrophysics
 Mihir Chowdhury (post doc 1962–64) – physical chemist, Shanti Swarup Bhatnagar laureate
 Margaret S. Collins (Ph.D. 1950) – invertebrate zoologist, professor and dean of the zoology department at Florida A&M University
 William Cottrell (A.B. 2002) – former Ph.D. candidate at the California Institute of Technology, described by scientists as a "genius", convicted in April 2005 of conspiracy to arson of 8 sport utility vehicles and a Hummer dealership in the name of the Earth Liberation Front (ELF)
 George Cowan (Ph.D. 1940) – scientist of the Manhattan Project, founder of the Santa Fe Institute
 Harmon Craig (Ph.D. 1951) – winner of Balzan Prize, the first in geochemistry; pioneer in Earth sciences
 James Dahlberg (Ph.D. 1966) – professor emeritus of biomolecular chemistry, University of Wisconsin–Madison
 Norman Davidson (B.S. 1937, Ph.D. 1941) – Caltech molecular biology professor, received a National Medal of Science
 Savas Dimopoulos (Ph.D. 1978) – theoretical physicist at Stanford; with Howard Georgi, he formulated the supersymmetric extension to the Standard Model, the leading theory for particle physics beyond the Standard Model
 Eleftherios Economou (Ph.D. 1969) – theoretical physicist at Univ. of Crete, Greece; known for his contributions in the field of surface plasmons; founder and Chairman of the Foundation for Research & Technology - Hellas (1983–2004)
 Frank Edwin Egler (S.B. 1932) – plant ecologist, winner of a Guggenheim Fellowship in 1955
 Larry Ellison (dropped out) – co-founder and CEO of Oracle Corporation, a major database software company
 Harvey Fletcher (Ph.D. 1911) – collaborator with Robert Millikan on the Nobel Prize-winning experiment on the charge of an electron; father of stereophonic sound
 Clark R. Landis (Ph.D. 1983) – chemist and professor of chemistry at the University of Wisconsin–Madison
 Robert Floyd (A.B. 1953, S.B. 1958) – computer scientist, Turing Award winner
 Jeannette Howard Foster (Ph.D. 1935) – librarian, professor, and researcher
 T. Theodore Fujita (S.B. 1953) – meteorologist, developed the Fujita scale for measuring tornadoes
 Gerald Gabrielse (Ph.D. 1980) – Professor of Physics at Harvard, known for his techniques of creating antimatter
 Martin Gardner (A.B. 1936) – author and columnist of "Mathematical Games" in Scientific American
 Richard Garwin (Ph.D. 1949) – physicist, author of first hydrogen bomb design, recipient of Presidential Medal of Freedom
 Greg Gbur – author and physicist who studies classical coherence theory in optical physics
 Piara Singh Gill (Ph.D. 1940) – physicist, pioneer in cosmic ray nuclear physics
 Mack Gipson Jr. (S.M. 1961, Ph.D. 1963) – first African-American to obtain a Ph.D. in Geology; founding advisor of the NABGG in 1981; consultant to NASA
 Richard Gordon (BSc Mathematics 1963) – adapted Kaczmarz method to create the Algebraic Reconstruction Technique
 John M. Grunsfeld – physicist and NASA astronaut
 Gu Yidong (Ph.D. Organic Chemistry 1935) – chemist and one of the founders of inorganic chemistry in China 
 Caroline Herzenberg (S.M. 1955, Ph.D. 1958) – physicist
 Seymour L. Hess (Ph.D. 1950) – meteorologist and planetary scientist who designed the weather instruments for the Viking 1
 Brian M. Hoffman (S.B. 1962) – bioinorganic chemist at Northwestern University
 Marian E. Hubbard  (S.B. 1894) – zoology professor at Wellesley College
 Edwin Hubble (S.B. 1910, Ph.D. 1917) – astronomer who found the first evidence for the Big Bang theory
 Christina Hulbe (Ph.D. 1998) – Antarctic researcher, geophysicist, glaciologist
 Deborah S. Jin (Ph.D. 1995) – physicist; MacArthur Fellow in 2003
 Donald Johanson (A.M. 1970, Ph.D. 1974) – paleoanthropologist who discovered "Lucy", a link between primates and humans
 Jason Jones (X. 1997) – co-founder of Bungie, the company behind Halo and Destiny
 Ernest Everett Just (Ph.D. 1916) – zoologist, biologist, physiologist, and research scientist
 William Tinsley Keeton (B.A. 1952, B.S. 1954) – zoologist known for work in animal navigation, and a popular professor at Cornell University
 Reatha Clark King (Ph.D. 1963) - research chemist whose work in flame fluorine calorimetry contributed to NASA's successful Apollo 11 moon landing
 Vern Oliver Knudsen (Ph.D. 1922) – co-founder of the Acoustical Society of America; Chancellor of UCLA from 1959 to 1960 
 Robert Kowalski – computer scientist in field of logic programming
 Martin Kruskal (S.B. 1945) – Professor Emeritus at Princeton University, started the soliton revolution in mathematics; advances included Kruskal-Shafranov Instability, Bernstein-Greene-Kruskal (BGK) Modes and the MHD Energy Principle, which laid theoretical foundations of controlled nuclear fusion, and Kruskal coordinates in theory of relativity
 Stephen Lee (Ph.D. 1986) – Professor of Chemistry at Cornell University; MacArthur Fellow
 Lynn Margulis (A.B. 1957) – Distinguished professor at the University of Massachusetts Amherst. National Medal of Science 1999 for Endosymbiotic Hypothesis. Also, developed Gaia theory with James Lovelock. 
 George Willard Martin – mycologist and professor at the University of Iowa
 Kirtley F. Mather (Ph.D. 1915) – Professor of Geology at Harvard University; President, American Association for the Advancement of Science; civil libertarian
 Sara Branham Matthews – microbiologist
 Stanley Miller (Ph.D. 1954) – performed classic Miller–Urey experiment on origin of life in collaboration with Harold Urey in 1953
 J. Howard Moore (A.B. 1898) –  zoologist, philosopher, educator and socialist who was an early advocate for animal rights based on Darwinian principles of shared evolutionary kinship
 William Wilson Morgan (S.B. 1927, Ph.D. 1931) – astronomer who co-developed MK system for classification of stars, as well as classification systems for galaxies and clusters; director of Yerkes Observatory
 Donald Osterbrock (A.B., Ph.D.) – astrophysicist known for his contributions to the body of knowledge on interstellar matter, gaseous nebulae, and the nuclei of active galaxies; President of American Astronomical Society; director of Lick Observatory
 Fushih Pan (M.D. 1986, Ph.D. 1989) – plastic surgeon; developer of the MIRA procedure
 Clair Cameron Patterson (Ph.D. 1951) – geochemist accurately determined the age of the Earth and discovered significant lead contamination of the environment
 Nikhil Mohan Pattnaik – Indian scholar, scientist, and science author
 Jeannette Piccard (S.M. 1919) – Balloon aeronaut, speaker for NASA, teacher, scientist and Episcopal priest
 Ida Kraus Ragins (B.A. 1918, M.S. 1919) – biochemist
 Raymond R. Rogers (Ph.D. 1995) – geology professor
 Nancy Grace Roman (Ph.D. 1949) - astronomer, NASA's Chief of Astronomy, planning of the Hubble Space Telescope
 Arthur H. Rosenfeld (Ph.D. 1954) – physicist; professor at University of California, Berkeley; energy efficiency pioneer
 Meyer Rubin (S.B. 1947, S.M. 1949, Ph.D. 1956) – geologist
 Carl Sagan (A.B. 1954, S.B. 1955, S.M. 1956, Ph.D. 1960) – astronomer, author of Contact; Pulitzer Prize winner
 Ann Linnea Sandberg (Ph.D. 1964) – immunologist at National Institute of Dental and Craniofacial Research
 John T. Scopes (X. 1931) – proponent of Charles Darwin's theory of evolution that led to the Scopes Trial and the inspiration for the play and film Inherit the Wind
 Alex Seropian (S.B. 1991) – co-founder of Bungie, the company behind Halo and Destiny
 Harold Horton Sheldon (Ph.D. 1920) – physicist, scientist, inventor, teacher, editor and author
 Herbert A. Simon (A.B. 1936, Ph.D. 1943) – computer scientist, Turing Award winner; economist, Nobel Prize winner
 Joanne Simpson (Ph.D. 1949) – meteorologist
 Pierre Sokolsky (B.A. 1967) – astrophysicist, Panofsky Prize Laureate, directed the HiRES Cosmic Ray Detector project and pioneer in ultra-high-energy cosmic ray physics
 Eugene Stevens (Ph.D. 1965) – known for research in biodegradable plastics
 Otto Struve (Ph.D. 1923) – astronomer, Fellow of the Royal Society
 David Suzuki (Ph.D. 1961) – Chair of the David Suzuki Foundation; award-winning scientist, environmentalist and broadcaster
 David Tannor (born 1958) – theoretical chemist, Hermann Mayer Professorial Chair in the Department of Chemical Physics at the Weizmann Institute of Science
 Shiro Tashiro (B.S. 1909,  Ph.D. 1912) – Japanese-American biochemist and professor
 Richard Thieme (M.A., 1967) – priest, technology consultant, author
 Richard E. Tracy (Ph.D. 1961) forensic pathologist
 Sherry Turkle (attended Committee on Social Thought, 1971) – Abby Rockefeller Mauze Professor of the Social Studies of Science and Technology at Massachusetts Institute of Technology
 Adah Elizabeth Verder (B.S. 1923, Ph.D.1928) –  medical bacteriologist and researcher at the National Institute of Allergy and Infectious Diseases
Chi Che Wang (M.S. 1916, Ph.D. 1918), biochemist, professor at Northwestern University and University of Cincinnati
 Richard Wassersug (Ph.D. 1973) – professor of anatomy at Dalhousie University
 Alvin M. Weinberg (B.S. 1935, M.S. 1936, Ph.D. 1939) – nuclear physicist, administrator at Oak Ridge National Laboratory during and after the Manhattan Project
 George Wetherill (Ph.B. 1948, S.M. 1949, S.M. 1951, Ph.D. 1953) – National Medal of Science winner, known for seminal work on formation of planets and solar system
 J. Ernest Wilkins Jr. (B.S. 1940) – nuclear scientist, mechanical engineer, and mathematician known for contribution to the Manhattan Project
 Erik Winfree (B.S.) – computer scientist, bioengineer, and professor at California Institute of Technology; MacArthur fellow in 2000
 Moddie Taylor (Ph.D. 1943) – chemist, known for contribution to the Manhattan Project while working in the Metallurgical Laboratory

Fictional
Sally Albright and Harry Burns, portrayed by Meg Ryan and Billy Crystal, in the film When Harry Met Sally...
Dr. Henry Walton "Indiana" Jones Jr., archaeologist and adventurer portrayed by Harrison Ford in the Indiana Jones film series 
Dr. Richard Kimble, MD, vascular surgeon wrongly convicted of his wife's murder, portrayed by Harrison Ford in the film The Fugitive
Drixenol "Drix" Koldreliff, a stoic cold pill in the movie Osmosis Jones, played by David Hyde Pierce 
Kitty Pryde, member of the superhero group the X-Men
Dr. Mark Taylor, ER Director in the TV series Code Black
Mark Watney, astronaut and titular main character in the novel The Martian. Portrayed by Matt Damon in the film adaptation.

References 

University of Chicago alumni
University of Chicago